Rumina is a genus of medium-sized predatory land snails, terrestrial pulmonate gastropod mollusks in the family Achatinidae.

Rumina is the type genus of the subfamily Rumininae.

Species
Species in the genus Rumina include:
 Rumina decollata (Linnaeus, 1758) - Decollate caracol 
 Rumina iamonae Quintana, 2017
 Rumina saharica (Pallary, 1901) 
 Rumina paviae (Lowe, 1861)
Synonyms
 Rumina chion (L. Pfeiffer, 1857): synonym of Zootecus chion (L. Pfeiffer, 1857) (superseded combination)
 Rumina polygyrata (Reeve, 1849): synonym of Zootecus polygyratus (Reeve, 1849) (superseded combination)
 Rumina pulla (J. E. Gray, 1834): synonym of Zootecus pullus (J. E. Gray, 1834) (superseded combination)
 Rumina pusilla H. Adams, 1867: synonym of Obeliscus pusillus (H. Adams, 1867) (original combination)

References

Further reading
 Mienis H. K. (2002). "Rumina paviae: the giant decollated snail from North Africa". Triton 5: 33-34.

External links
 Jan, G. (1830). Scientia naturalis cultoribus. Conspectus methodicus Testaceorum in collectione mea exstantium anno 1830. 8 pp. Parma
 Risso, A. (1826-1827). Histoire naturelle des principales productions de l'Europe Méridionale et particulièrement de celles des environs de Nice et des Alpes Maritimes. Paris, F.G. Levrault. 3(XVI): 1-480, 14 pls

Achatinidae
Gastropod genera